List of initialisms, acronyms ("words made from parts of other words, pronounceable"), and other abbreviations used by the government and the military of the United States. Note that this list is intended to be specific to the United States government and military—other nations will have their own acronyms.

0–9
 0K – Zero Killed (pronounced OK, as the expression that everything is okay)
 1LT – First Lieutenant (U.S. Army) (USMC uses "1stLt" and USAF uses "1st Lt")
 2LT – Second Lieutenant (U.S. Army) (USMC uses "2ndLt" and USAF uses "2nd Lt")
 2IC – Second In Command
 1SG – First Sergeant (E-8 Army)
 777 – (Pronounced triple 7) Refers to the M777 howitzer, a towed 155 mm artillery weapon. It succeeded the M198 howitzer in the United States Marine Corps and United States Army in 2005. The M777 is also used by the ground forces of Australia, Canada, India and Saudi Arabia. It made its combat debut in the War in Afghanistan.

A
 A – Analog
 A1C – Airman First Class (USAF E-3)
 A2C2 – Army Airspace Command And Control
 A-3 – (Operations Directorate (COMAFFOR))
 A-5 – (Plans Directorate (COMAFFOR))
 AA – Anti-Aircraft
 AA – Armed Forces America
 AA – Assembly Area
 AA – Assessment Agent
 AA – Avenue Of Approach
 AAA – Army Audit Agency
 AAA – Antiaircraft Artillery
 AAA – Arrival And Assembly Area
 AAA – Assign Alternate Area
 AAAD – Airborne Anti-Armor Defense
 AAAS – Amphibious Aviation Assault Ship
 AABB – American Association of Blood Banks
 AABWS – Amphibious Assault Bulk Water System
 AAC – Activity Address Code
 AACG – Arrival Airfield Control Group
 AADC – Area Air Defense Commander
 AADP – Area Air Defense Plan
 AA&E – Arms, Ammunition, And Explosives
 AAEC – Aeromedical Evacuation Control Team
 AAFC – Australian Air Force Cadets (Australia)
 AAFES – Army and Air Force Exchange Service
 AAFIF – Automated Air Facility Information File
 AAFS – Amphibious Assault Fuel System
 AAFSF – Amphibious Assault Fuel Supply Facility
 AAGS – Army Air-Ground System
 AAI – Air-To-Air Interface
 AAM – Air-To-Air Missile
 AAMDC – US Army Air And Missile Defense Command
 AAOE – Arrival And Assembly Operations Element
 AAOG – Arrival And Assembly Operations Group
 AAP – Allied Administrative Publication
 AAP – Assign Alternate Parent
 AAR – After Action Report
 AAR – After Action Review
 AAS – Army Apprentice School (Australia)
 AAST – Aeromedical Evacuation Administrative Support Team
 AAT – Automatic Analog Test
 AAT – Aviation Advisory Team
 AAU – Analog Applique Unit
 AAV – Amphibious Assault Vehicle
 AAW – Antiair Warfare
 AB – Airbase
 AB – Airman Basic (USAF E-1)
 ABCA – American, British, Canadian, Australian Armies Program
 ABCS – Army Battle Command System
 ABD – Airbase Defense
 ABU – Airman Battle Uniform (U.S. Air Force)
 ABV – Assault Breacher Vehicle (U.S. Army)
 ABFC – Advanced Base Functional Component
 ACU – Army Combat Uniform (U.S. Army)
 ADOS – Active Duty, Operational Support
 ADSW – Active Duty, Special Work
 AE – Armed Forces Europe
 AEW&C – Airborne Early Warning And Control
 AFI – Awaiting Further Instruction/Air Force Instruction (requirement guide)
 AFMC – Armed Forces Medical College
 AFOQT – Air Force Officer Qualifying Test
 AFOSI – United States Air Force Office of Special Investigations
 AFSC – Air Force Specialty Code
 AHA – Ammunition Holding Area
 AIM – Airborne Intercept Missile (U.S. Military)
 AIP - Assignment Incentive Pay
 AIPD – Army Institute For Professional Development
 AIS – Automated Information System
 AIT – Advanced Individual Training (U.S. Army)
 Amn – Airman (USAF E-2)
 ALCON – All Concerned (U.S. Military)
 AMU – Aircraft Maintenance Unit
 AMXG – Aircraft Maintenance Group
 AMXS – Aircraft Maintenance Squadron
 ANG – Air National Guard (USAF)
 AOC – Air Operations Center
 AOL –  Absent Over Leave (U.S. Navy)
 AO – Area Of Operations
 AOR – Area of responsibility
 A&P – Administrative And Personnel
 AP – Armed Forces Pacific
 AP – Armor-Piercing
 APC – Armored Personnel Carrier
 APFSDS – Armor-Piercing Fin-Stabilized Discarding Sabot
 APFT – Army Physical Fitness Test (U.S. Army)
 APFU – Army Physical Fitness Uniform (U.S. Army)
 APO – Army Post Office; See Also FPO
 APPN – Appropriation Number (U.S. Military)
 APRT – Army Physical Readiness Test (U.S. Army)
 ARCENT/TUSA – US Army Central/HQ Third US Army (TUSA)
 ARPANET – Advanced Research Projects Agency Network (e.g., 1969 to 1989; antecedent of the information superhighway; now DARPA)
 ARM – Anti-Radar Missile
 ARM – Anti-Radiation Missile
 ARMS – Automated Recruit Management System (U.S. Military)
 ARMS – Aviation Resource Management System (USAF)
 ARNG – Army National Guard (U.S. Army)
 ARS – Air Refueling Store 
 ART – Alarm Response Team (USAF)
 ARVN – Army Of The Republic Of (South) Viet Nam (U.S. Military)
 ASAP – Army Substance Abuse Program (U.S. Military)
 ASAP – As Soon As Possible
 ASEAN – Association Of South East Asian Nations
 ASM – Air-to-Surface Missile
 ASCM – Anti-Ship Cruise Missile
 ASROC – Anti-Submarine ROCket
 ASV – Anti-Surface Vessel (airborne radar)
 ASVAB – Armed Services Vocational Aptitude Battery
 ASW – Anti-Submarine Warfare
 ATC – Air Training Corps
 ATC – Air Traffic Control
 ATFU – Ate The Fuck Up (not squared away)
 ATO – Air Tasking Order
 ATO – Antiterrorism Officer
 ATRRS – Army Training Requirements And Resources System
 AWACS – Airborne Warning and Control System
 AWOL –  Absent Without Leave

B
 BAH – Basic Allowance for Housing
 BAMCIS – Begin planning, Arrange recon, Make the plan, Complete the plan, Issue the order, Supervise (U.S. Marine Corps five paragraph order)
 BAR – Browning Automatic Rifle
 BAS - Basic Allowance for Subsistence
 BAU – Behavioral Analysis Unit
 BCD – Battlefield Coordination Detachment 
 BCD – Bad Conduct Discharge (aka Big Chicken Dinner)
 BCG – Birth Control Glasses (U.S. military slang)
 BCT – Basic Combat Training (U.S. Army)
 BCT – Brigade Combat Team
 BDA – Bomb Damage Assessment or Battle Damage Assessment
 BDE – Brigade (U.S. Army)
 BDF – Barbados Defence Force (Barbados)
 BDU – Battle Dress Uniform (U.S. military)
 Be – Beriev (Russian)
 BEA – Budget Execution Authority (U.S. Navy)
 BEQ – Batchelor Enlisted Quarters (U.S. military) 
 BFT – Blue Force Tracker (U.S. military)
 BG – Bodyguard
 BGHR – By God He's Right (U.S. military)
 BLUF – Bottom Line Up Front (U.S. military)
 BMNT – Begin Morning Nautical Twilight (U.S. Army)
 BMOW – Boatswain's Mate Of The Watch (U.S. Coast Guard)
 BN – Battalion (U.S. Army)
 BOHICA – Bend Over Here It Comes Again (U.S. military slang)
 BRAC – Base Realignment And Closure
 BRAT (American) – Born Raised And Transferred (American usage, refers to dependent children of military personnel) Usually pronounced "Military Brat" (Or "Air Force BRAT", or Army "Brat", Navy "Brat" etc.).
 BRAT (British) – British Regiment Attached Traveler (British military usage, may have been the original usage, which was later adapted to the American military: Means "child that travels with a soldier"), or "Born, Raised and Trapped". Usually pronounced "Military Brat" or "Base Brat".
 BUB – Battle Update Brief
 BVR – Beyond Visual Range (USAF)
 BX – Base Exchange (USAF)
 BZ – spoken "Bravo Zulu", meaning "congratulations, job well done"

C
 C1 – Command
 C2 – Command And Control
 C3 – Command Control And Communication
 C4ISTAR – Command, Control, Communication, Computers;  Intelligence, Surveillance, Target Acquisition, And Recognition
 C6ISR – Command, Control, Communications, Computers, Cyber-defense and Combat systems, and Intelligence, Surveillance, Reconnaissance
 CAC – Common Access Card (U.S. DoD, pron. "cac")
 CAG – Commander, Air Group (U.S. Navy, pron. "cag")
 CAG – Civil Affairs Group.  Term used for military members assigned to assist civilian governments with restoring infrastructure (All U.S. branches, pron. "cag")
 CAGE – Commercial and Government Entity
 CALL – Center for Army Lessons Learned
 CAP - Combat Air Patrol
 CAP - Civil Air Patrol
 CAPT – Captain (U.S. Navy, USCG O-6)
 Capt – Captain (USMC O-3)
 CPT – Captain (U.S. Army, USAF O-3)
 CAS – Close Air Support
 CASEX – Coordinated Anti-Submarine EXercise
 CASEVAC – Casualty Evacuation
 CAT – Combat Application Tourniquets
 CBRN – Chemical Biological Radiological Nuclear
 CBU – Cluster Bomb Unit
 CCIP – Continually Calculated Impact Point (USAF/USMC Aviation)
 CCIR – Commanders Critical Information Requirements
 CCP – Casualty Collection Point
 CCRP – Continually Calculated Release Point (USAF/USMC Aviation)
 CDAT – Computerized Dumb Ass Tanker (M1 Abrams Crewmen)
 CDIAC – Carbon Dioxide Information Analysis Center
 CDRUSPACOM – Commander United States Pacific Command
 CENTCOM – Central Command (U.S. Military)
 CF – Cluster Fuck (always pronounced phonetically "Charlie Foxtrot")
 CHU – Containerized Housing Unit
 Chief – Chief Warrant Officer
 CIA – Central Intelligence Agency
 CIB – Combat Infantry Badge
 CIC – Command Intelligence Center (U.S. Navy)
 CINCLANT – Commander-in-chief, Atlantic Forces (U.S. Navy before 2002)
 CINCLANTFLT – Commander-in-chief, Atlantic Fleet (U.S. Navy before 2002)
 CINCPAC – Commander-in-chief, Pacific Forces (U.S. Navy before 2002)
 CIWS – Close-In Weapon System
 CJOTUS – Chief Justice of the United States
 CMB – Combat Medical Badge
 CMSgt – Chief Master Sergeant (USAF E-9; highest AF enlisted rank)
 CMSAF – Chief Master Sergeant of the Air Force (USAF E-9 – Senior Enlisted Member)
 CO – Commanding Officer
 COA – Course of Action
 COB – Chief Of the Boat (Chief Petty Officer in charge of the Boat usually a Master Chief (USN Submariner Terminology))
 CoB – Close of Business (End of the duty day)
 COCOM – Combatant Commander
 CODELS – Congressional Delegations
 COL – Colonel
 COMINT – Communications Intelligence
 COMPACFLT – Commander, Pacific Fleet (U.S. Navy)
 COMSEC – Communication Security
 CONUS – Continental United States (U.S. military, pron. "cone-us")
 CONUSA – Continental United States Army (numbered Armies of U.S. military)
 CORDS – Civil Operations and Revolutionary Development Support (U.S. military, Vietnam era)
 COP – Combat Out Post
 CoS – Chief of Staff
 COT – Commissioned Officer Training
 CPL – Corporal (U.S. Army and Marine Corps E-4)
 CPO – Chief Petty Officer (USCG/USN E-7)
 CPT – Captain (U.S. Army O-3)
 CP – Check Point (Usually Numbered i.e. "CP1")
 CPX – Command Post Exercise
 CQB – Close Quarters Battle
 CRC – CONUS Replacement Center (a military processing center at Fort Benning, Georgia, US)
 CSM – Command Sergeant Major (U.S. Army E-9 highest Army enlisted rank))
 CSAR – Combat Search And Rescue
 CT – Counter-terrorism Team
 CTA – Common Table of Allowances 
 CTR – Close Target Reconnaissance
 CUB – Commander Update Brief
 CVN – Nuclear-powered Aircraft Carrier (NOTE: the V comes from the expression "heavier than air flying machine")
 CWO – Chief Warrant Officer
 CZN – Nuclear-powered Airship Carrier (NOTE: the Z comes from the use of the word Zeppelin although non-Zeppelin airships would also be transported on a CZN)

D
 DA – Defence Attaché
 DAC – Department of the Army Civilian
 DAGO – Department of the Army General Officer
 DAGR – Defense Advanced GPS Receiver
 DARPA – Defense Advanced Research Projects Agency (U.S. Military)
 DASA – Division Artillery Security Area
 DAT – Dumb Ass Tanker
 DC3 – Department of Defense Cyber Crime Center
 DCAA – Defense Contract Audit Agency
 DCMA – Defense Contract Management Agency
 DD-214 – Certificate of Release or Discharge from Active Duty
 DEROS – Date Estimated Return From Overseas
 DEVGRU –  United States Naval Special Warfare DEVelopment GRoUp
 DFAC – Dining Facility (U.S. Military)
 DFAS – Defense Finance and Accounting Service (U.S. Military) 
 DIA – Defense Intelligence Agency
 DIFM - Due In From Maintenance
 DINFAC – Dining Facility (U.S. Military)
 DISA – Defense Information Systems Agency
 DLA – Defense Logistics Agency
 DLB – Dead Letter Box
 DMDC – Defense Manpower Data Center
 DME – Depot Maintenance Enterprise (U.S. Military)
 DMEA – Defense Microelectronics Activity
 DMS – Defense Message System (U.S. Military)
 DMZ – Demilitarized Zone
 DOA – Dead on Arrival
 DoDAAC – Department of Defense Activity Address Code (U.S. Military)
 DoDAF – Department of Defense Architecture Framework (U.S. Military)
 DoDIC – Department of Defense Identification Code (U.S. Military)
 DOEHRS – Defense Occupational and Environmental Health Readiness System (U.S. Military)
 DOP – Drop-Off Point
 DPMs – Disruptive Pattern M
 DRT – Dead Right There; wounded in such a way as to indicate immediate and/or unavoidable death; often used as a sarcastic form of the civilian acronym DOA (Dead On Arrival)
 DTO – Daily Tasking Order
 DTRA – Defense Threat Reduction agency
 DZ – Drop Zone

E
 E&E – Escape and Evade
 EA – Electronic Attack
 ECP – Entry Control Point
 EDCSA – Effective Date of Change of Strength Accountability (obsolete for U. S. Army)
 EFP - Explosively Formed Penetrator
 EHRS – Electronic Health Records (Software)
 EI – Engineering and Installation
 EIS – Engineering and Installation Squadron, Environmental Impact Statement
 EIB – Expert Infantry Badge
 EI SIT – Engineering and Installation Site Implementation Team
 EKIA – Enemy Killed in Action
 ELINT – Electronic Intelligence
 EMI – Extra Military Instruction
 ENS – Ensign (U.S. Navy junior officer rank, O-1)
 EOD – Explosive Ordnance Disposal
 EOS – End of Service
 EP – Electronic Protection
 EPR − Enlisted Performance Report
 EPW – Enemy Prisoner of War
 ERV – Emergency Rendezvous
 ESSENCE – Electronic Surveillance System for Early Notification of Community-based Epidemics (U.S. Military)
 ETA – Estimated time of arrival
 ETS – Expiration Term of Service
 EUCOM – European Command (U.S. Military)
 EW – Electronic Warfare (comprises EA, EP)
 Exfil – Exfiltration (Opposite of infiltration; exiting undetected)

F
 FA – Field Artillery
 FAK – First Aid Kit
 FAR – Federal Acquisition Regulation
 FBCB2 – Force XXI Battlefield Command Brigade and Below
 FBI – Federal Bureau of Investigation
 FEBA – Forward Edge of the Battle Area
 FFE  – Fire for effect
 FIDO – Fire Direction Officer
 FIGMO – Fuck It, Got My Orders
 FIST – Fire Support Team
 FISTer – Member of a Fire Support Team
 FIST-V – Fire Support Team Vehicle
 FISINT – Foreign Instrumentation Signals Intelligence
 FISHDO – Fuck It, Shit Happens, Drive On
 FitRep – Fitness Report
 FLOT – Forward Line of Troops
 FLOTUS – First Lady of the United States (U.S. – see POTUS)
 FM –  Field Marshal; more commonly "Field Manual"
 FMC – Fully Mission Capable
 FMTV – Family of Medium Tactical Vehicles (U.S. Army)
 FNG – Fucking New Guy
 FO – Forward Observer
 FO – Foxtrot Oscar  (i.e. Fuck Off) (US/UK Forces)
 FOB – Forward Operating Base
 FOD – Foreign Object Damage (U.S.)
 FOD – Foreign Object Debris (U.S.)
 FOI – Field of Imaging
 FPO – Fleet Post Office; See also APO
 FRACU – Flame-Resistant Army Combat Uniform (U.S. Army)
 FSA – Force Structure Allowance
 FSTE – Foreign Service Tour Extension
 FTG – Fleet Training Group (U.S. Navy) or Fuck The Guard (U.S. Coast Guard)
 FTUS – Full Time Unit Specialist
  – Fouled Up Beyond All Recognition or Fucked Up Beyond All Repair
 FYSA – For Your Situational Awareness
 FYI – For Your Information

G
 G1 – General Staff Level office for Personnel and Manpower (Division and Above)
 G2 – General Staff Level office for Military Intelligence (Division and Above)
 G3 – General Staff Level office for Operations and Plans (Division and Above)
 G4 – General Staff Level office for Logistics (Division and Above)
 G5 – General Staff Level office for Military/Civil Affairs (Division and Above)
 G6 – General Staff Level office for Signal and Communication (Division and Above)
 G7 – General Staff Level office for Training and Exercises (Division and Above)
 G8 – General Staff Level office for Force Development and Analysis (Division and Above)
 G9 – General Staff Level office for Civil Operations (Division and Above)
 GBU – Guided Bomb Unit
 GEN – General
 GI – Government Issue
 GIG – Global Information Grid
 GIGO – Garbage In Garbage Out
 GM – Gone Mersault
 GO – General Officer
 GOCO – Government owned, contractor operated
 GPMG – General Purpose Machine Gun
 GPS – Global Positioning System
 GS – General Schedule

H
 HAAMS – High Altitude Airdrop Missions
 HAHO – High Altitude High Opening
 HALO – High Altitude Low Opening (Airborne)
 HAU – 
 HBL – Holiday Block Leave (U.S. Army)
 HE – High Explosive
 HEAT – High-Explosive Anti-Tank
 HEP – High Explosive, Plastic (U.S. usage for HESH)
 HESH – High-explosive squash head (British anti-tank and anti-fortification round)
 HIMARS – High Mobility Artillery Rocket System
 HMAS – Her Majesty's Australian Ship (Australia)
 HMCS – Her Majesty's Canadian Ship (Canada)
 HMFIC – Head Motherfucker In Charge – colloquialism for the highest-ranking person present; more commonly used by NCO's than by officers (United States Armed Forces)
 HMMWV – High Mobility Multipurpose Wheeled Vehicle (U.S. Military) (Pronounced Humvee)
 HMNZS – Her Majesty's New Zealand Ship (New Zealand)
 HMS – Hans Majestäts Skepp (His Majesty's ship, Sweden)
 HMS – Her Majesty's Ship (Royal Navies such as British Royal Navy) (His Majesty's Ship if King)
 Hr.Ms – His/Her Dutch Majesty's Ship (Dutch Royal Navy ship)
 HOMSEC – Homeland Security
 HRAP – Hometown Recruiter Assistance Program
 HQ – Headquarters
 HHB – Headquarters and Headquarters Battery (artillery units)
 HHC – Headquarters and Headquarters Company
 HHT – Headquarters and Headquarters Troop (cavalry units)
 HUMINT – Human Intelligence (intelligence gathering)
 HVI – High Value Individual
 HVT – High Value Target
 HYT – High Year Tenure

I
 IAF – Indian Air Force
 IAF – Israeli Air Force
 IAVA – Information Assurance Vulnerability Alert (U.S. Military)
 ICBM – Intercontinental ballistic missile
 ICE – Individual Carrying Equipment, e.g. All-purpose Lightweight Individual Carrying Equipment
 ID – IDentification
 IED – Improvised explosive device
 IFAK – Individual First aid kit
 IFF – Identification Friend or Foe
 IFF – Introduction to Fighter Fundamentals (USAF)
 IG – Inspector General (U.S. Military)
 IFV – Infantry Fighting Vehicle
 Il – Ilyushin, Russian aircraft company
 IN – Infantry
 INSCOM – United States Army Intelligence and Security Command
 Interpol – International Criminal Police Organization
 IOC – Initial Operational Capability
 ISO – Inter School Course
 ISR – Intelligence, Surveillance, and Reconnaissance
 IYAAYAS – "If You Ain't AMMO, You Ain't Shit"

J

 JA – Judge Advocate [General]
 JAFO – Just Another Fucking Observer
 JAG – Judge Advocate General
 JDAM – Joint Direct Attack Munition
 JSF – Joint Strike Fighter program
 JATO – Jet-assisted Take Off
 JETDS – Joint Electronics Type Designation System
 JNN – Joint Network Node (U.S. Army)
 JSAM – Joint Service Achievement Medal
 JSTARS – Joint Surveillance Target Attack Radar System
 JSOC – Joint Special Operations Command
 JTF – Joint Task Force
 JTAC - Joint Terminal Attack Controller
 JEEP  – "Just Enough Essential Parts"

K
 KATUSA – Korean Augmentation to the United States Army (also known by lower ranking U.S. soldiers as "Koreans Aggravating The U.S. Army")
 KIA – Killed In Action
 KFOR – Kosovo Force
 KISS – Keep It Simple, Stupid
 KO – Contracting Officer, Navy
 KP – Kitchen Police or Kitchen Patrol
 KBO – Keep Buggering On

L
 LAAD  – Low Altitude Air Defense
 LAAT  – Low Altitude Assault Transport
 LAV   – Light Armored Vehicle 
 LCDR – Lieutenant Commander (U.S. Navy)
 LCpl – Lance Corporal (U.S. Marines)
 LES  – Leave and Earnings Statement
LIC – Low Intensity Conflict
 LP  – Listening Post
 LP/OP  – Listening Post Observation Post
 LPC  – Leather Personnel Carrier (boot)
 LGOP – Little Group Of Paratroopers
 LMTV – Light Medium Tactical Vehicle (U.S. Army)
 LPO – Leading Petty Officer (U.S. Navy)
 LT – Lieutenant
 LTC or Lt Col or LtCol– Lieutenant Colonel (U.S. Army, U.S. Marine Corps, U.S. Air Force)
 LTG or Lt Gen or LtGen – Lieutenant General (U.S. Army, U.S. Marine Corps, U.S. Air Force)
 LTJG – Lieutenant, Junior Grade (U.S. Navy)
 LRIP – Low-Rate Initial Production
 LUP – Lying-Up Point
 LZ – Landing Zone

M
 MACV/SOG – Military Assistance Command Vietnam / Studies and Observation Group
 MAJ – Major
 MARCORSYSCOM – MARine CORps SYStems COMmand (U.S. Military)
 MARCENT Marine Corps Central Command
 MARFORRES – MARine FORces REServe (U.S. Marine Corps)
 MARSOC – Marine Corps Forces Special Operations Command
 MAV – Micro Air Vehicle
 MAW – Maximum Allowable Weight
 MBT – Main battle tank
 MC 326/2 – ″NATO Medical Support Principles and Policies″, approved by Military Committee, second revision.
 MCCS – Marine Corps Community Services (also known by the humorous backronym "Marine Corps Crime Syndicate")
 MCEN – Marine Corps Enterprise Network (U.S. Military)
 MCEITS – Marine Corps Enterprise Information Technology Service (U.S. Military)
 MCPO – Master Chief Petty Officer (USCG/USN E-9)
 MCPOCG – Master Chief Petty Officer of the Coast Guard (U.S. Coast Guard E-9 – Senior Enlisted Member)
 MedEvac – Medical evacuation
 MFA –  Ministry of Foreign Affairs
 MG – Machine gun
 MG – Major general
 MI – Military Intelligence
 Mi – Mil Moscow Helicopter Plant (Russian)
 MIA – Missing in action
 MICAP – Mission Impaired Capability Awaiting Parts
 MICV – Mechanized Infantry Combat Vehicle ( an Infantry fighting vehicle)
 MiG – Mikoyan-Gurevich (Russian)
 MILCON – Military Construction
 MK – Mark
 MK – Machinery Technician (U.S. Coast Guard rating)
 MLRS – Multiple Launch Rocket System
 MMFD – Miles and Miles of F...ing Desert (unofficial report in Gulf War)
 MOA – Military Operating Area (USAF Airspace)
 MOAB – Massive Ordnance Air Blast bomb, also known as "Mother Of All Bombs".
 MOAC – Mother of All Coffee (Green Bean Coffee)
 MOB – Main Operating Base
 MOBCOM – MOBile COMmand
 MOPP – Mission Oriented Protective Posture
 MOS – Military Occupation Specialty
 MOUT – Military Operations in Urban Terrain
 MPDS – Military Planning Data Allowance
 MRAP – Mine-Resistant Ambush Protected
 MRE – Meal, Ready-to-Eat (U.S. Military)
 MRX – Mission Rehearsal Exercise
 MSG – Master Sergeant (US Army E-8)
 MSgt – Master Sergeant (USAF E-7)
 MSO – Marine Safety Office (U.S. Coast Guard)
 MTOE – Modified Table Of Organizational Equipment
 MTS+ – Movement Tracking System Plus
 MTV – Medium Tactical Vehicle (U.S. Army)
 MSDC+ – Marine Science Diving Club (Diving Club Of Hasanudin University)
 MSR – Main Supply Route
 MSR – Major Supply Route
 MWR – Morale Welfare Recreation

N
 NAFTA – North American Free Trade Agreement
 NAS – Naval Air Station
 NATO – North Atlantic Treaty Organization
 NCIS – Naval Criminal Investigative Service (U.S. Navy)
 NAVAIR – Naval Air Systems Command
 NAVCENT – Naval Forces Central Command (U.S. Navy)
 NAVOCEANO – Naval Oceanographic Office
 NBACC – National Biodefense Analysis and Countermeasures Center
 NCI – National Cancer Institute
 NCO – Non-Commissioned Officer
 NCOIC – Non-Commissioned Officer in Charge
 NCOES – Non-Commissioned Officer Education System
 ND – Negligent Discharge
 NDP – Night Defensive Position
 NEFF – New Equipment Fielding Facility
 NIBC National Interagency Biodefense Campus
 NICBR – National Interagency Confederation for Biological Research
 NLT – No Later Than
 NMC – Not Mission Capable
 NME – Non-Mission Essential
 NMCI – Naval Marine Corps Intranet (U.S. Navy)
 NNMSA – Non-Nuclear Munitions Storage Area
 NOC – Non Official Cover
 NORAD – North American Aerospace Defense Command
 NPDES – National Pollutant Discharge Elimination System
 NS – Network Services
 NSA – National Security Agency
 NSW – Naval Special Warfare
 NSWDG – Naval Special Warfare Development Group
 NUB – Non-Useful Body / Nuclear Unqualified Bitch (U.S. Nuclear Navy)

O
 OBE –  Overcome/Overrun By Events
 OCONUS – Outside Continental United States
 OCP – Operational Camouflage Pattern (U.S. Army, U.S. Air Force)
 OCS – Officer Candidate School
 ODA – Operational Detachment-Alpha (the standard 12-man team composed of U.S. Army Special Forces operators)
 ODU – Operational Dress Uniform (U.S. Coast Guard)
 OIC – Officer in Charge
 OIG – Office of Inspector General
 OM – On the Move (Normally just spelled out Oscar Mike)
 O&M, MC – Operations & Maintenance, Marine Corps (U.S. Navy)
 O&M, N – Operations & Maintenance, Navy (U.S. Navy)
 OODA – Observe, Orient, Decide, and Act
 OP – Observation Post
 OPFOR – Opposing Force or Opposition Force
 OPR – Officer Performance Report
 OPT – Operational Planning Team
 ORM – Operational Risk Management
 Oscar – Man overboard
 OSM – Oh Shit Moment (U.S. Marine Corps)
 OSP – On Site Procurement
 OSP – Orbital Services Program
 OPORD – Operations Order
 OPSEC – Operations Security
 OTF – Out There Flapping (Airborne)
 OTS – Officer Training School
 OTV – Outer Tactical Vest

P
 PACOM – Pacific Command
 PACAF – Pacific Air Forces
 PAQ – PALACE Acquire
 PCS – Permanent Change of Station
 PDS – Permanent Duty Station (U.S. Military)
 PDT – Pre-Deployment Training
 PE – Plastic Explosive
 PFC – Private First Class (U.S. Military)
 PFM – Pure Fuckin Magic (U.S. Military)
 PFT – Physical Fitness Test
 PII – Personally Identifiable Information or Personal Identity Information
 PL – Platoon Leader (U.S. Army)
 PLL – Prescribed Load List  (U.S. Army)
 PLT – Platoon (U.S. Army)
 PMC – Partially Mission Capable
 PME – Professional Military Education
 PMS – Planned Maintenance Schedule (U.S. Navy)
 PNG – Passive Night Goggles
 PO – Post Office
 PO1 – Petty Officer 1st Class (USCG/USN E-6)
 PO2 – Petty Officer 2nd Class (USCG/USN E-5)
 PO3 – Petty Officer 3rd Class (USCG/USN E-4)
 POBCAK – Problem Occurs Between Chair And Keyboard
 POL – Petroleum Oil & Lubricants (U.S. Air Force)
 POC – Point Of Contact
 POTUS – President of the United States
 POG – Person Other than Grunt (All non-combat arms job fields i.e. any MOS or CMF other than infantry, cavalry, armor, and artillery; among infantrymen, refers to anyone other than infantry or Special Forces)
 POW – Prisoner Of War
 POV – Privately Owned Vehicle
 PPG – PT Parade Games
 PPPPPPP, (the Seven P's) – Proper Prior Planning Prevents Pitifully (colloquially "Piss") Poor Performance
 PRP – Personnel Reliability Program
 PRP – Pretty Retarded Program
 PRT – Provincial Reconstruction Team
 PRT – Physical Readiness Training (U.S. Army)
 PT – Physical Training
 PTB – Powers That Be
 PV2 – Private 2nd class (U.S. Army E-2)
 PVT – Private (U.S. Army and Marine Corps E-1)
 PX – Post Exchange (U.S. Army)

R
 RAAF – Royal Australian Air Force
 RAF – Royal Air Force (UK)
 RAN – Royal Australian Navy
 RATELO – Radiotelephone Operator
 RATO – Rocket Assisted Take Off
 RCSC – Royal Canadian Sea Cadets (Canada)
 REMF – Rear Echelon Mother Fucker
 RFL – Response Force Leader
 RMC – Royal Military College of Canada
 RN – Royal Navy (UK)
 ROE – Rules Of Engagement
 ROMA Data, Right Out of My Ass Data. Unverifiable created data (different from SWAG)
 ROWPU – Reverse Osmosis Water Purification Unit
 RNZAF – Royal New Zealand Air Force
 ROZ – Restricted Operating Zone
 RP – Rendezvous point
  RPG – Rocket-propelled grenade
 RPM – Rounds per minute (Rate of fire)
 RS – RatShit (Australia – related to U.S. – Unserviceable)
 RSS – Regional Security System (Caribbean)
 RTB – Return To Base
 RV – rendezvous
 RTO – Radiotelephone Operator

S
 SA – Seaman Apprentice (USCG/USN E-2)
 SA – Situation Awareness
 SAAS – Standard Army Ammunition System (U.S. Army)
 SAM – Surface-to-Air Missile
 SAR – Search and Rescue (U.S. Coast Guard)
 SARS – Search and Rescue Swimmer
 SARSS – Standard Army Retail Supply System (U.S. Army)
 SAS – Special Air Service (British special forces)
 SBS – Special Boat Service (British special forces)
 SCIF – Sensitive Compartmented Information Facility
 SCO – Squadron Commander (Squadron as used in the U.S. Army Regimental System)
 SCOTUS – Supreme Court of the United States
 SCPO – Senior Chief Petty Officer (USCG/USN E-8)
 SD – "Status Destroyed" or "Salty Dog". (Equipment that is written off as unrepairable and unsalvageable.  )
 SDD – Solution Delivery Division (Military Health)
 SEAC – Senior Enlisted Advisor to the Chairman of the Joint Chiefs of Staff
 SFAS – Special Forces Assessment Selection
 SEAL – Sea, Air and Land (U.S. Navy SEALs)
 SERE – Survival, Evasion, Resistance and Escape
 SFC – Sergeant First Class (U.S. Army E-7)
SFOD-A – United States Army Special Forces Operational Detachment Alpha – U.S. Special Forces team (see ODA)
SFOD-B – Special Forces Operational Detachment Bravo – U.S. Special Forces support group
SFOD-C – Special Forces Operational Detachment Charlie – U.S. Special Forces command group
SFOD-D –   Special Forces Operational Detachment Delta (U.S. Army counter-terrorism unit)
 SGM – Sergeant Major (U.S. Army E-9 – Sometimes referred to as Staff Sergeant Major)
 SGT – Sergeant (U.S. Army E-5) (U.S. Marines uses Sgt)
 SHORAD – Short Range Air Defense
 SITREP –  Situation Report
 SJA – Staff Judge Advocate
 SLAM –  Standoff Land Attack Missile
 SLBM – Submarine-launched ballistic missile
 SLOTUS – Second Lady of the United States
 SMA – Sergeant Major of the Army (U.S. Army E-9 – Senior Enlisted Member)
 SMEAC – Situation Mission Execution Admin/logistics Command/signal (U.S. Marine Corps basic knowledge)
 SMSgt – Senior Master Sergeant (USAF E-8)
 SN – Seaman (USCG/USN E-3)
 SNAFU – Situation Normal: All Fucked/Fouled Up
 SOCCENT –  Special Operations Command Central
 SOCOM – United States Special Operations Command
 SOFA – Status of Forces Agreement
 SOL –  Shit Out of Luck (U.S. Army)
 SOLJWF – Shit Out of Luck and Jolly Well Fucked (U.S. Marines)
 SOP – Standard Operating Procedures
 SOS – Shit On a Shingle, or creamed chipped beef on toast.
 SPC – Specialist (U.S. Army E-4)
 SPORTS – Slap, Pull, Observe, Release, Tap, Shoot.
 SR – Seaman Recruit (USCG/USN E-1)
 SrA – Senior Airman (USAF E-4)
 SRBM – Short Range Ballistic Missile
 SRR – Special Reconnaissance Regiment (British special Forces)
 SSBN – Nuclear-Powered Ballistic missile submarine
 SSDD – Same Shit Different Day
 SSDDBS – Same Shit Different Day Bigger Shovel
 SSG – Staff Sergeant (U.S. Army E-6)
 SSGN – Nuclear-Powered Cruise missile submarine
 SSgt – Staff Sergeant (U.S. Air Force E-5) (U.S. Marines E-6)
 SSN – Nuclear-powered attack submarine
 STOVL – Short Takeoff, Vertical Landing
 SUSFU – Situation Unchanged, Still Fucked Up
 SWAG – Scientific Wild Ass Guess
 SWAK – Sealed With A Kiss

T
 TACP – Tactical Air Control Party (USAF)
 TAD – Temporary Additional Duty (U.S. Military)
 TAO – Tactical Action Officer (U.S. Military)
 TBD – To Be Determined
 TC3 – Tactical Combat Casualty Care
 TCCC – Tactical Combat Casualty Care
 TDPFO – Temporary Duty Pending Further Orders (U.S. Military)
 TDY – Temporary Duty (U.S. Military)
 TEL – Transporter Erector Launcher
 TF – Task Force
 TFOA – Things Falling Off Aircraft
 TG6 – Task Group 6 (group designation for NZ SAS – NZ Army)
 TOC – Tactical Operations Center
 TIC – Troops In Contact
 TSgt – Technical Sergeant (USAF E-6)
 TU – Tits Up (dead, inoperable), a.k.a. "Tango Uniform"
 TARFU – Things Are Really Fucked Up, or Totally And Royally Fucked Up
 TRADOC- U.S. Army Training and Doctrine Command

U
 UA – Unauthorized Absence
 UA - Urinalysis
 UAS – Unmanned Aerial System
 UAV – Unmanned Aerial Vehicle
 UCP – Universal Camouflage Pattern (U.S. Army)
 UCAV – Unmanned Combat Air Vehicle
 ULLS – Unit Level Logisitics System (U.S. Army)
 UMA – Unit Mobilization Assistor
 UN – United Nations
 US – Unserviceable
 USS – United States Ship
 USSS – United States Secret Service
 USAF – United States Air Force
 USAFA – the United States Air Force Academy at Colorado Springs, Colorado 
 USAFE – United States Air Forces in Europe
 USAMRICD – United States Army Medical Research Institute of Chemical Defense
 USAMRIID – United States Army Medical Research Institute of Infectious Disease
 USAMRMC – United States Army Medical Research and Materiél Command
 USAMRAA – United States Army Medical Research Acquisition Activity
 USA PATRIOT Act – Uniting and Strengthening America by Providing Appropriate Tools Required to Intercept and Obstruct Terrorism Act
 USAREC – US Army REcruiting Command
 USAREUR – U.S. Army European Command
 USASOC – U.S. Army Special Operations Command
 USFK - United States Forces Korea
 USCG – United States Coast Guard
 USCGC – United States Coast Guard Cutter
 USMA – United States Military Academy (U.S. Army) at West Point, New York 
 USMC – United States Marine Corps
 USN – United States Navy
 USNA – United States Naval Academy (U.S. Navy) at Annapolis, Maryland
 USO – United Service Organizations (U.S. Military)
 USR – Unit Status Report
 UUV – Unmanned Underwater Vehicle
 UXB – Unexploded Bomb (bomb disposal; British)
 UXO – Unexploded Ordnance

V
 VBIED – Vehicle-Borne Improvised Explosive Device
 VDM – Visual Distinguishing Mark
 VFD – Volunteer Fire Department
 VFR – Volunteer Fire and Rescue (or in Aviation Visual Flight Rules)
 VPOTUS – Vice President of the United States

W
 WIA – Wounded In Action
 WO1 – Warrant Officer 1
 WSA – Weapons Storage Area
 WMD – Weapons of Mass Destruction
 WILCO – Will Comply
 WCS – Worst Case Scenario
 WORM – War operating ready material

X

 XO – Executive Officer

Y

 YGBSM – You Gotta Be Shitting Me

See also
 Military slang
 List of acronyms
 List of government and military acronyms
 List of U.S. Air Force acronyms and expressions
 List of U.S. Marine Corps acronyms and expressions
 List of U.S. Navy acronyms

References

External links
 AcronymFinder – Military and Government
 Abbreviation.com – Military Abbreviations
 All Acronyms – Military Acronyms
 Acronyms List – US Military Acronyms

U.S. Government
Government-related lists
United States military-related lists
Acronyms
Military terminology of the United States
United States